The 1989 LPGA Championship was held May 30 to June 2 at Jack Nicklaus Golf Center at Kings Island in Mason, Ohio, a suburb northeast of Cincinnati.  Played on the Grizzly Course, this was the 35th edition of the LPGA Championship.

Nancy Lopez shot a final round 66 (−6) for 274 (−14), three strokes ahead of runner-up Ayako Okamoto, the third 

It was the last of three major titles for Lopez; all came on the Grizzly Course at the LPGA Championship.

It was the also the last LPGA Championship at Kings Island, which had hosted twelve consecutive championships since 1978. The Kroger Senior Classic on the Senior PGA Tour replaced it in 1990.

Past champions in the field

Source:

Final leaderboard
Sunday, May 21, 1989

Source:

References

External links
Golf Observer leaderboard

Women's PGA Championship
Golf in Ohio
LPGA Championship
LPGA Championship
LPGA Championship
LPGA Championship
Women's sports in Ohio